Austropetaliidae is a small family of dragonflies occurring in Chile, Argentina and Australia.
Members of Austropetaliidae can be medium-sized to large dragonflies.

This group was initially created for some archaic members of the family Neopetaliidae and was promoted to family rank in 1994.

Genera
The family includes the following genera:
 Austropetalia 
 Archipetalia 
 Hypopetalia 
 Phyllopetalia

References

 
Aeshnoidea
Odonata of Australia
Odonata families